Li Ting and Sun Tiantian won the first edition of this tournament in an all-Chinese final.

Seeds

Draw

References

Guangzhou International Women's Open
2004 WTA Tour
2004 in Chinese tennis
Sport in Guangzhou